Milson is a small village and civil parish in Shropshire, England. The Church of England parish church is dedicated to Saint George and is in the Diocese of Hereford.

During the 1970s a small popular airstrip for light aircraft, named MILSON, was created on a small farm within the parish.  It is a popular destination during the summer months and is used occasionally by military helicopters from the Defence Helicopter Flying School (DHFS) at RAF Shawbury.

See also
Listed buildings in Milson, Shropshire

References

Villages in Shropshire
Civil parishes in Shropshire